The Jackson Building is a historic building in Gainesville, Georgia. It was built in 1915 by Levi Prater for Felix Jackson, a businessman who also invested in railroads and steamships in Texas and Philadelphia. It was the tallest building in Gainesville upon its completion. It was designed in the Classical Revival style by S.D. Trowbridge. It has been listed on the National Register of Historic Places since August 1, 1985.

References

National Register of Historic Places in Hall County, Georgia
Neoclassical architecture in Georgia (U.S. state)
Buildings and structures completed in 1915